Group C of the 2001 Copa América was one of the three groups of competing nations in the 2001 Copa América. It comprised Bolivia, Costa Rica, Honduras, and Uruguay. Costa Rica and Honduras were invited to replace Argentina and Canada, who were originally drawn into this group but withdrew shortly before the start of the tournament. Group play ran from 13 to 19 July 2001.

Costa Rica won the group and faced Uruguay—the third-placed team of the same group and best-ranked third-placed team overall—in the quarter-finals. Honduras finished second and faced Brazil, the winners of Group B, in the quarter-finals. Bolivia finished fourth in the group, and were eliminated from the tournament.

Standings

All times are in local, Colombia Time (UTC−05:00).

Matches

Bolivia vs Uruguay

Honduras vs Costa Rica

Uruguay vs Costa Rica

Honduras vs Bolivia

Bolivia vs Costa Rica

Honduras vs Uruguay

External links
Copa América 2001 at RSSSF

Group C
2001 in Bolivian football
2001 in Uruguayan football
2000–01 in Honduran football
2000–01 in Costa Rican football